The term Leben, variously laban, liben, lben  or Aɣu, Iɣi (Shilha: ⴰⵖⵓ) in the Middle East and North Africa, refers to a food or beverage of fermented milk. Generally, there are two main products known as leben: in the Levant region and parts of Arabia and North Africa (Maghreb), buttermilk. Leben can be served at breakfast, lunch or dinner.

Buttermilk variant
Leben as a drink is traditionally prepared by letting milk ferment for around 24 hours, then churning and removing the butter. The remaining buttermilk can keep for several days at room temperature. In modern times, it is produced industrially.

Yogurt variant 
Leben in parts of the Middle East is traditionally prepared by boiling milk, usually whole milk, then adding yogurt (or previously made, left over/store-bought leben), and then cooled overnight.

In Israel  
In the early 20th century, small dairies run by Ashkenazi Jews in what was then Ottoman Palestine began producing the yogurt variant in quantity. It was called leben, from the Arabic, meaning "white", cognate to the Hebrew "לָבָן"‎‎ (lavan). Leben was of extremely high importance to Jews during the British Mandate years, and was considered a dietary staple. During the tzena (austerity) period that followed independence, leben qualified for the state rationing system and was issued as a basic staple dairy product. Due to its importance during tzena, leben became indelibly ingrained in Israeli culture. In the 1970s, strawberry and chocolate flavoured varieties of leben appeared on store shelves, but these have largely been supplanted by fruit-flavoured yogurts, and the only leben available is unflavoured.

See also
 List of yogurt-based dishes and beverages
Yogurt 

Similar beverages:
 Cacık
 Chal
 Chalap
 Doogh
 Kumis
 Lassi
 Ayran
 Kefir
 Strained yogurt (labneh)
 Filmjölk

References

External links

Arab cuisine
Israeli cuisine
Bahraini cuisine
Emirati cuisine
Jordanian cuisine
Kuwaiti cuisine
Lebanese cuisine
Levantine cuisine
Palestinian cuisine
Omani cuisine
Saudi Arabian cuisine
Syrian cuisine
Fermented dairy products
Non-alcoholic drinks
Yogurt-based drinks
Milk-based drinks